Regassa or Regasa is an Oromo male name(lit. one who fixes) that may refer to:

Dejenee Regassa (born 1989), Ethiopian long-distance runner competing for Bahrain
Genzeb Shumi Regasa  (born 1991), Ethiopian female middle-distance runner for Bahrain
Mulualem Regassa (born 1984), Ethiopian footballer
Tilahun Regassa (born 1990), Ethiopian marathon runner

Oromo-language names